The 2018 Idaho Vandals football team represented the University of Idaho in the 2018 NCAA Division I FCS football season. The Vandals played their home games on campus at the Kibbie Dome in Moscow, Idaho, and are members of the Big Sky Conference, which they rejoined for football this season. A charter member of the Big Sky in 1963, Idaho was previously a football member from 1965 through 1995. They were led by sixth-year head coach Paul Petrino and finished the season at 4–7 (3–5 in Big Sky, ninth).

Previous season 
The Vandals finished the 2017 season at 4–8 (3–5 in Sun Belt, eighth), their final year in FBS.

Preseason

Polls
On July 16, 2018 during the Big Sky Kickoff in Spokane, Washington, the Vandals were predicted to finish in fourth place in the coaches poll and fifth place in the media poll.

Preseason All-Conference Team
The Vandals had three players selected to the Preseason All-Conference Team.

Noah Johnson – Jr. OL

Kaden Ellis – Sr. LB

Cade Coffey – So. P

Schedule

 Official Schedule

Game summaries

at Fresno State

Western New Mexico

at UC Davis

Portland State

at Idaho State

at Montana State

Southern Utah

at Eastern Washington

North Dakota

Montana

at Florida

NFL Draft

List of Idaho Vandals in the NFL Draft

References

Idaho
Idaho Vandals football seasons
Idaho Vandals football